Daniel Alan Passino (born January 30, 1995) is an American singer and songwriter. He became an artist on Season 10 of NBC's The Voice, March 8, 2016 at age 21. In The Top 10, he was eliminated.

Life and career 
Passino was born and raised in New Boston, Michigan, a suburb of Detroit. He moved to Ann Arbor, Michigan in 2012 to attend the University of Michigan for Vocal Performance and Communications. At the University of Michigan, he joined The University of Michigan Men's Glee Club and their subset a capella group The Friars. On August 3, 2016, he released his debut single titled "Tell Me".. He now crushes sales at Yelp Inc.

The Voice
On March 8, 2016 Passino auditioned for Season 10 of The Voice and turned the chairs of Christina Aguilera and Blake Shelton. Passino chose Christina Aguilera as his coach. On March 21 (Episode 8), he won his battle against Kristen Marie. On March 28 (Episode 10), he lost in the knockout rounds against Alisan Porter. On April 12 (Episode 15), he advanced to the live playoffs as a coach comeback on Team Pharrell.

Singles

References

External links 
 The Friars 
 University of Michigan Men's Glee Club

1995 births
Living people
The Voice (franchise) contestants
University of Michigan School of Music, Theatre & Dance alumni
People from Wayne County, Michigan
People from Garden City, Michigan